Miss Divine Beauty 2020 was the 2nd edition of Miss Divine Beauty held on 30 August 2020 virtually. Tejaswini Manogna crowned Tanvi Kharote as her successor at the end of the virtual pageant.

Final results

Special Awards

Format

Selection of participants 
Online registration for auditions commenced on 25 June 2020. City auditions were held only at selected locations in India due to the COVID-19 pandemic situation. The contestants and auditions were divided into four zones, which had a mentor to each zone. Auditions were held for all states and union territories of India. The pageant explores potential talent in all states and union territories of India, selecting 7-8 ambassadors to represent their area in the national finals. Empowering local talents, these representatives will be titled Miss Divine Beauty 2020 or Miss Earth India Finalists 2020 and the national winner will be crowned in the 2020 grand finale.

Top 15 
The top 15 finalists were selected through a virtual meeting among the 40 shortlisted contestants. The Top 15 Finalists were officially announced on 18 August 2020 via the Miss Divine Beauty's social media pages. On 24 August 2020, it was confirmed that Rich Sinha, a selected finalist, will be withdrawing from the contest due to her conflicting schedules from her modeling career.

Top 6 
The selection of the Top 6 finalists from the Top 15 is based on preliminary activities that include, public choice, video of various walking styles, virtual interviews, social work done or willingness to work for the environment and to protect Mother Earth. It was revealed on 28 August 2020.

Finalists

Top 6 
The Top 6 finalists were revealed on 28 August 2020:

Top 15 
The Top 15 semifinalists were revealed on 18 August 2020:

References

External links
 Miss Divine Beauty website
 https://www.mypunepulse.com/tanvi-kharote-to-represent-india-at-miss-earth-2020/

2020 beauty pageants
2019 in India
August 2020 events in India